Silves or Ilha de Silves is an island municipality in the state of Amazonas, northern Brazil.

History
Silves is one of the oldest municipalities in the state of Amazonas.  It was established in 1660 
(some sources say 1663) as a Jesuit Indian mission, the aldea of Santa Cruz.  It was abandoned a year later when Jesuits were evicted from the area for failure to cooperate with Portuguese slave raiders.  In 1685, it was reestablished by Mercedarian Theodozio da Viega at the same site and known by the name of aldea de Saracá (named for the lake).  Two more villages were founded by Mercedarian missionaries on Rio Urubu and had the names of São Pedro Nolasco and São Raimundo. They disappeared shortly after founding. In 1759, the aldea of Saracá was elevated to a village with the name Silves, after civil parish of Silves, Portugal.

See also
 Itacoatiara another old mission town nearby

References

Municipalities in Amazonas (Brazilian state)